Eva Roth (born 26 December 1967 in Augsburg) is a German slalom canoeist who competed in the late 1980s and the early 1990s. She finished fourth in the K1 event at the 1992 Summer Olympics in Barcelona.

World Cup individual podiums

References
 Sports-Reference.com profile

1967 births
Canoeists at the 1992 Summer Olympics
West German female canoeists
German female canoeists
Living people
Olympic canoeists of Germany
Sportspeople from Augsburg